La La Land is the second LP by the Louisville-based band Wax Fang. It was originally released on November 17, 2007 by Don't Panic Records. It was re-issued by Absolutely Kosher on May 11, 2010 for vinyl.

Track listing
All songs written by Scott Carney.

Personnel 
 Scott Carney - Guitar, Vocals, Keyboards, Piano, Percussion, Theremin
 Jacob Heustis - Bass Guitar, Keyboards
 Kevin Ratterman - Drums, Keyboards, Percussion

Additional musicians 
 Doug Easley - Pedal Steel, Crying Robot
 Ben Sollee - Cello, Viola
 Cheyenne Mize - Violin
 Heather Floyd - Trumpet
 D.W. Box - Tuba
 David Cronin - Background Vocals
 Corey McAfee - Stomps and Claps
 Sarah Nettleton - Choir
 Anita Streeter - Choir
 Elizabeth Righmyer - Choir
 Naomi Scherich - Choir
 Harvey Turner - Choir
 George Dechurch - Choir
 Robert Adleberg - Choir
 Joe Scherich - Choir

Production 
 Wax Fang - Producer, Mixing
 Kevin Ratterman - Engineer
 Doug Easley - Engineer
 Jason Gilespie - Assistant Engineer
 Mark Nevers - Mixing
 Jim Demain - Mastering

In popular culture 
The songs Majestic and At Sea, both from this album, were featured on the 151st episode of American Dad! entitled '"Lost In Space'" in 2013.

References 

2007 albums